The Little Egg Harbor Township School District is a comprehensive community public school district that serves students in pre-kindergarten through sixth grade from Little Egg Harbor Township, in Ocean County, New Jersey, United States.

As of the 2020–21 school year, the district, comprised of three schools, had an enrollment of 1,609 students and 150.0 classroom teachers (on an FTE basis), for a student–teacher ratio of 10.7:1.

The district is classified by the New Jersey Department of Education as being in District Factor Group "B", the second-lowest of eight groupings. District Factor Groups organize districts statewide to allow comparison by common socioeconomic characteristics of the local districts. From lowest socioeconomic status to highest, the categories are A, B, CD, DE, FG, GH, I and J.

Public school students in seventh through twelfth grades attend the schools of the Pinelands Regional School District, which also serves students from Bass River Township, Eagleswood Township and Tuckerton Borough. Schools in the district (with 2020–21 enrollment data from the National Center for Education Statistics) are 
Pinelands Regional Junior High School with 526 students in grades 7-8 and 
Pinelands Regional High School with 1,036 students in grades 9–12. The high school district's board of education  is comprised of nine members directly elected by the residents of the constituent municipalities to three-year terms on a staggered basis, with three seats up for election each year. Little Egg Harbor Township is allocated six of the nine seats.

History
The district is composed of two elementary schools. The George J. Mitchell School opened in 1953 as the "Little Egg Harbor Elementary School", housing grades K-6. In 1989, a new school, the Frog Pond Elementary School opened as the "Little Egg Harbor Intermediate School", housing grades 3–6, while the Mitchell School housed grades K-2 from then on.

Starting with the 2009–10 school year, both schools were renovated and converted into K-6 schools, with the Intermediate School being renamed to its current name.

Based on the results of a study performed by the Southern Regional Institute and Educational Technology Training Center of Stockton University, and in the wake of declining enrollment and rising costs, the Bass River Township School District decided to have all of its PreK-6 students attend the Little Egg Harbor district as part of a sending/receiving relationship, starting in the 2020-21 school year.

Strafing incident

The test was going pretty well, until a heavy gun from the left wing fired 25 rounds of 20mm ammunition up in the air, which fell to the ground, with eight striking the roof of the school, and the rest hitting the parking lot and the side of the building. No one was injured in the incident.

On November 1, 2006, the district and the United States Air Force announced that a settlement had been reached, whereby the district would be paid $519,070.70 to cover damage to the roof of the school caused in the incident. This is less than the $900,000 that the superintendent had indicated would be needed to cover the costs of replacing the roof damaged in the incident and in the process of evaluating the roof's condition after the incident.

Schools
Schools in the district (with 2020–21 enrollment data from the National Center for Education Statistics.) are:
Robert C. Wood Sr. Early Childhood Center with 249 students in pre-kindergarten
Dr. Anne Flynn, Principal
George J. Mitchell Elementary School with 577 students in kindergarten through third grade
Deniese Guinan, Principal
Frog Pond Elementary School with 785 students in grades 4 to 6
Thomas P. Denning, Principal

Administration
Core members of the district's administration are:
Dr. Melissa McCooley, Superintendent
Nicholas Brown, Business Administrator / Board Secretary

Board of education
The district's board of education, comprised of seven members, sets policy and oversees the fiscal and educational operation of the district through its administration. As a Type II school district, the board's trustees are elected directly by voters to serve three-year terms of office on a staggered basis, with either two or three seats up for election each year held (since 2012) as part of the November general election. The board appoints a superintendent to oversee the district's day-to-day operations and a business administrator to supervise the business functions of the district.

References

External links
Little Egg Harbor Township School District

School Data for the Little Egg Harbor Township School District, National Center for Education Statistics
Pinelands Regional School District

Little Egg Harbor Township, New Jersey
New Jersey District Factor Group B
School districts in Ocean County, New Jersey